Broads Green is a hamlet in the civil parish of Great Waltham and the Chelmsford district, of Essex, England.

Nearby settlements include the town of Chelmsford and the villages of Great Waltham and Little Waltham. For transport there is the B1008 road, the A131 road and the A130 road nearby. Broad's Green public house is The Walnut Tree.

References 
 Essex A-Z (page 57)

Hamlets in Essex
Great Waltham